Serhii Oleksiyovych Kamyshev (8 April 1956 – 14 February 2021) was a Ukrainian diplomat, Ambassador Extraordinary and Plenipotentiary of Ukraine to the People's Republic of China.

Biography 
He was born on 8 April 1956 in Dnipropetrovsk. In 1977 Serhii Kamyshev graduated from the Donetsk State University (Faculty of Economics); in 1993 – from the Diplomatic Academy of the Ministry of Foreign Affairs of the Russian Federation.

Career 
1977-1990 – he held different positions in the coal mining state enterprises, Donetsk (Ukraine)

1990-1991 – he was Deputy Head of the Kirov District Council of People's Deputies, the City of Donetsk

1993-1994 – chief consultant on international relations, the Donetsk Board of Directors of Enterprises and Entities

March–June 1994 – First Secretary, Department of International Economic, Scientific and Technical Cooperation, Ministry of Foreign Affairs of Ukraine

1994-1998 – First Secretary, Counsellor, Embassy of Ukraine in the Arab Republic of Egypt

1998-2001 – Minister-Counsellor, Charge d'Affaires of Ukraine in the Lebanese Republic and Charge d'Affaires of Ukraine in the Syrian Arab Republic (non-resident)

2001-2002 – Director, Fifth Territorial Department (Asia and Pacific, Middle East and Africa), MFA of Ukraine

2002-2003 – Director General, Directorate General of Bilateral Cooperation, MFA of Ukraine

2003-2004 – Ambassador at Large, MFA of Ukraine

2004-2009 – he was Ambassador of Ukraine to the People's Republic of China, Ambassador of Ukraine to Mongolia (non-resident)

2009-2010 – Director of the Consular Department, the MFA of Ukraine

2010-2011 – Deputy Minister of the Cabinet of Ministers of Ukraine

2011-2014 – Deputy Head of the Secretariat of the Cabinet of Ministers of Ukraine

August–December 2019 – he was Advisor to the Head of the Office of the President of Ukraine

From 18 December 2019 – he was Ambassador Extraordinary and Plenipotentiary of Ukraine to the People's Republic of China.

14 February 2021 – died at the age of 64.

References

External links 
 Ambassador of Ukraine in China

1956 births
2021 deaths
Donetsk National University alumni
Ambassadors of Ukraine to Egypt
Ambassadors of Ukraine to Lebanon
Ambassadors of Ukraine to Mongolia
Ambassadors of Ukraine to China
People from Dnipro